is a Japanese footballer currently playing as a forward for Gainare Tottori.

Career statistics

Club
.

Notes

References

External links

1997 births
Living people
Japanese footballers
Association football forwards
Kansai University alumni
J3 League players
Gainare Tottori players